Mississaugas of the Credit First Nation (meaning: "Mississauga people at the Credit River") is a Mississauga Ojibwa First Nation located near Brantford in south-central Ontario, Canada. In April 2015, MCFN had an enrolled population of 2,330 people, 850 of whom lived on the  MCFN Reserve. The first nation governs the 2,392.6-hectare parcel of New Credit 40A Indian Reserve known as Reserve 40B near Hagersville, Ontario. This reserve is located beside the Six Nations of the Grand River, near Brantford.

In the 19th century, under pressure from the rapid growth of the European-origin population, the Mississaugas wanted to move from their reserve in the present-day City of Mississauga. (The reserve had been granted to the Six Nations by the Haldimand Proclamation in gratitude for their military alliance with the British during the American Revolutionary War, allowing their resettlement from their previous homeland in what had become New York State.) The Six Nations is the only reserve in the Canadian system with a subsection reserve. The Mississaugas eventually purchased the land gifted as well as an additional  for a sum of $10,000.00 on June 15, 1903, for the all-time right of undisturbed use and occupancy of the land. The reserve as it stands today consists of lots 1 to 12 in the first and second concessions in the Township of Tuscarora, in the County of Brant, and lots 1-12 in the first and second concessions in the Township of Oneida. In 1997, MCFN purchased an additional  bordering on Highway 6, Hagersville.

The First Nation made claims to land on which Toronto sits through the disputed Toronto Purchase of 1787. In 2010, Canada agreed to pay  for the lands, based on the historic value of the land, extrapolated to current dollars. The money was distributed to the band government, with each of the 1,700 present day Mississaugas receiving $20,000, with the rest placed in trust for future generations. The Band put a controversial hold on new  band membership during this time, ostensibly to preserve the greatest financial gain possible. The multi-million dollar settlement was only given to previously registered members despite any valid claims to membership.

On January 8, 2019 the Mississaugas of the New Credit announced that they would rename as The Mississaugas of the Credit.

Prominent members 
 Harry LaForme, appellate court judge, served as head of the Indian Residential Schools Truth and Reconciliation Commission
 Walt Secord, Australian politician.
 Chief Wakabinine, Mississauga Chief and Warrior who died enroute from York, Upper Canada in 1796 protecting his sister from British soldier Charles McEwan
 Peter Jones (Kahkewāquonāby), Chief and Methodist minister

References

External links
Official website of the Mississaugas of the Credit First Nation
AANDC profile

First Nations governments in Ontario
Mississaugas
Association of Iroquois and Allied Indians
Mississauga reserves in Ontario
Communities in Norfolk County, Ontario
Communities in Haldimand County